Taz-Mania is an American animated sitcom produced by Warner Bros. Animation from 1991 to 1995, broadcast in the United States on Fox Kids. The show follows the adventures of the Looney Tunes character Taz (the Tasmanian Devil) in the fictional land of Tazmania (based on Tasmania).

Similar to other Warner Bros. cartoons of its time, such as Animaniacs and Tiny Toon Adventures (both of which were created by Taz-Mania co-developer Tom Ruegger), Taz-Mania frequently broke the fourth wall, and often made jokes showing that Taz could actually speak perfectly normally when he wanted to. The intro indicates that, in this rendering of Tasmania, "the sky's always yellow, rain or shine". The title song is performed by Jess Harnell and Jim Cummings.

Characters

Tazmanian Devil family
Taz Tazmanian Devil (Jim Cummings) is the central character of the series and appears in every episode. Taz is the older brother of Molly and Jake. Taz is uncouth, feral, dirty, always hungry, and has a dislike of water, though he is less vicious and more caring than his original incarnation. He works as a bellhop at the Hotel Tazmania.
Jean Tazmanian Devil (Miriam Flynn)  is Taz, Molly, and Jake's loving, hard-working mother. Many episodes circle around her speaking on the phone and running through a long list of chores she has created for herself.
Hugh Tazmanian Devil (Maurice LaMarche) is Taz, Molly, and Jake's suave, friendly, and logical father, whose voice and mannerisms are a parody of Bing Crosby. Hugh likes orange juice (a reference to Crosby being a famous pitch-man for orange juice), golf, and bowling and he will often overexplain things to the point where he will say "blah-blah-blah, yackity schmackity".
Molly Tazmanian Devil (Kellie Martin) is Taz and Jake's 16-year-old sister. Despite being more composed than her brother, she often shares his wild and aggressive nature, though in a more sibling-rivalry sense.
Jake Tazmanian Devil (Debi Derryberry) is Taz and Molly's crazy, hyperactive, cute, and imaginative little brother, who idolizes Taz.
Dog the Turtle (Rob Paulsen) is Taz, Molly, and Jake's pet turtle, who acts like a dog.
Drew Tazmanian Devil (Maurice LaMarche) is Taz, Molly, and Jake's good-humored, cool, zany, and lovable uncle, who talks and acts like Bob Hope as a reference to Hugh's parody of Bing Crosby. Like Hugh, Drew enjoys golf, bowling, telling jokes, and heading out on road trips (often forcing Taz into joining them) in spoofs of Hope and Crosby's Road to... film series of the 1940s and 1950s.

Hotel Tazmania staff
Bushwhacker Bob (Jim Cummings) is Taz's arrogant, incompetent, neglectful, belligerent, intimidating, oppressive, and bad-tempered boss. As the owner of the Hotel Tazmania, he is a misanthropic snob, who rarely does any actual work, preferring to leave any and all tasks to his staff. His demeanor is inspired by that of Basil Fawlty, protagonist of the British sitcom Fawlty Towers.
Mum (Rosalyn Landor) is Bushwhacker Bob's mother, who is much more patient and intelligent than her son. Despite her son owning the Hotel Tazmania, Mum is the true leader of the establishment. She is often quick to embarrass her son, much to Bob's disgust, despite her comments typically being true.
Constance Koala (Rosalyn Landor) is an enormous but gentle and kind-hearted koala, who is the maid at the Hotel Tazmania. She is quite fond of singing and dancing, despite her dancing often causing unintentional destruction. She is in the same dance class that Molly takes when Taz tries ballet.
Mr. Thickly (Dan Castellaneta) is an optimistic, genial, and fun-loving wallaby whose exact job title is unspecified. He considers himself a jack-of-all-trades, always prefacing the activities he does with Taz with an exclamation that he's "an expert". He enjoys doing favors for Taz, but his ineptitude usually results in chaos.

Outback characters
Digeri Dingo (Rob Paulsen) is a selfish dingo who pretends to be Taz's friend so he can avoid dangerous situations and pain at Taz's expense.  He and Taz share a mutual love for bottle cap collecting. A scavenger, treasure hunter, and chronic collector, he often takes advantage of Taz's strength and ferocious nature to hunt rare treasures. Typically, after he gets what he wants, he still berates Taz for bringing it back in a tarnished condition. His name is a play on the digeridoo. 
Wendal T. Wolf (Jim Cummings) is a Tasmanian Wolf, also known as a Thylacine, and is desperate for any type of friendship. He resembles Wile E. Coyote. When not being hunted by Taz, he usually drives him crazy in his efforts to befriend him. His personality closely resembles that of Woody Allen.
Francis X. Bushlad (Rob Paulsen) is a white-skinned, red-haired aboriginal boy who unsuccessfully hunts Taz as a rite of manhood. Despite their tribal society, his entire tribe behave and speak like well-educated, posh businessmen. His father parodies Jim Backus. His name recalls silent movie star Francis X. Bushman.

Minor characters
Bull Gator and Axl (John Astin, Rob Paulsen) are two alligators who unsuccessfully try to trap Taz for the enjoyment of zoo-going children around the world (as a rather weak pretense to the massive financial gain the endeavor will grant them). Bull is the leader of the duo, always acting in a happy and upbeat attitude even while reprimanding Axl. Axl is Bull's hunter-in-training, constantly naïve, though often subject to Bull's "corrections" (typically in the form of a mallet smashing). They vaguely resemble Laurel and Hardy.
Buddy Boar (Jim Cummings), is a boar, who acts like a yuppie, is often seen talking on his cellphone, and claims to be "Taz's best friend". Though Buddy tends to take advantage of Taz at times, he does not seem to treat him nearly as badly as Digeri Dingo does. He was established early in the show, but was seemingly ill-received, reflected in several fourth wall-breaking moments by the show's characters. As such, Buddy's appearances were uncommon. His later appearances suggest he was promoted to the show's producer after he was considered to be an unlikable character on the show proper, and he later attempts to direct an episode featuring Bull and Axl – with catastrophic results.
Daniel and Timothy, the Platypus Brothers (Maurice LaMarche, Rob Paulsen) are twin platypus brothers (Timothy wears glasses), whose love of do-it-yourself projects usually ends up causing trouble for Taz. They closely resemble Daffy Duck in appearance and manner of speech. A pair of episodes deals with their obsession with the primetime cartoon "The McKimsons", a Simpsons parody featuring a character who constantly shouts "No way, I'm out of here, man!"
The Keewee is a silent bird somewhat resembling a kiwi. It can run as fast as the Road Runner, often being chased down by Taz in search of his lunch in the same manner as Wile E. Coyote.
The Bushrats (head Bushrat: Phil Proctor) are a group of bush rats in tribal costume. They speak in an odd mix of real and nonsense languages that are appended by mismatched, humorous subtitles. Their favorite phrase is "Spanfirkel!", which is similar to the German word Spanferkel which translates to "small, young pig, which still gets suckled".
Willie Wombat (Phil Proctor), originally cast in a Bugs Bunny-like role against Taz, resents this typecasting and greatly admires Taz and his career. His determination to remain pacifistic and polite usually reverts to frustration and rage by the end of his episodes. Ironically, his friendly nature was previously used by Bugs in 1980's "Spaced Out Bunny".

Looney Tunes characters
Bugs Bunny (voiced by Greg Burson), in "A Devil of a Job", appears as a deus ex machina, driving a souped-up jeep out of a quicksand pit, saving Bushwhacker Bob and Mr. Thickley. In Willie Wombat's debut episode, Willie phones Bugs for advice about how to handle Taz.
Daffy Duck (voiced by Maurice LaMarche) is seen riding along with Bugs in the jeep in "A Devil of a Job". He tells him, "I told you this was the left at Albuquerque".
Yosemite Sam (voiced by Maurice LaMarche), after Willie phones Bugs for advice, is called by Taz. He is never actually seen. He expresses surprise that Taz has his own show by asking "Ain't you retired yet?".
Sam Sheepdog (voiced by Jim Cummings), in one episode, was working as a sheepdog. Taz, working as a temporary agent for carnivorous predators, substitutes for Ralph Wolf and attempts to steal sheep from Sam's pen. (A bit of character confusion was at play here, as at one point Sam suggests, "i thought i was a bit too hard on that coyote last week").
Foghorn Leghorn (voiced by Greg Burson), because of his name, was mistaken for a hotel critic by Bushwhacker Bob.
 Beaky Buzzard makes a cameo in the show where he's seen relaxing on his nest.
Marvin the Martian (voiced by Rob Paulsen) once comes to Earth on vacation, glad his plans to destroy it failed. His attempts at relaxation are thwarted by Taz's noisy behavior, cajoling him into wanting to destroy Earth again, and his actions indeed cause Earth to explode due to a temporal anomaly.
Road Runner makes a cameo appearance in the show and is caught by Taz. Taz is then about to eat him, but lets the bird go after Axl and Bull try to kidnap Taz.
Wile E. Coyote makes a cameo appearance in the show when he's being seen at the Boulder Museum.

Episodes

Episodes are copyright 1991 (1–15), 1992 (16–47), or 1993 (48–65); note that this does not always correspond with when they originally aired. The series premiered on September 7, 1991, and ended on May 22, 1995.

Season 1 (1991)

Season 2 (1992)

Season 3 (1993)

Season 4 (1994–95)

Video games

Five video games based on the show were made, two by Sega for the Sega Mega Drive/Genesis, Sega Master System, and Sega Game Gear, and three by Sunsoft consisting of one for the SNES and two for the Game Boy.

Home media
Three VHS tapes were released in 1993. After the show ceased running on Fox Kids, it was rerun on TNT, for a short time on TBS in 1996–1997 (before and after the Time Warner/Turner merger) as part of their Disaster Area block, and has also been rerun on Cartoon Network, making it the first Warner Bros. Animation series to air on that network.

A DVD containing the first four episodes of the series was released in Europe in April 2010, whilst later released in the UK in 2011 under the title "Taz and Friends" as part of the Kids' WB "Big Faces" series.

A DVD containing the 5 to 8 episodes of the series was released in Europe in July 2019, whilst later released in the UK in 2019 under the title "Taz and Friends, Volume 2" as part of the Cartoon Network "Big Faces" series.

On May 14, 2013, Warner Home Video released Taz Mania – Season 1, Part 1: Taz on the Loose on DVD in Region 1 for the first time. Season 1, Part 2 was released on August 6, 2013. On June 19, 2020, the third season was announced for a DVD release on August 25 under the company's Warner Archive Collection division.

Other appearances
In the Duck Dodgers episode "M.M.O.R.P.D.", one of the forms that Duck Dodgers turns himself into Axl gator. In this brief appearance, Axl gator's vocal effects are reprised by Rob Paulsen. Taz himself appears with Duck Dodgers in the episode "Deathmatch Duck".

References

External links

 
 Opening theme at RetroJunk
 Show clips

1990s American animated television series
1991 American television series debuts
1995 American television series endings
1990s American sitcoms
American animated sitcoms
American animated television spin-offs
American children's animated comedy television series
English-language television shows
Fox Broadcasting Company original programming
Fox Kids
Looney Tunes television series
Bugs Bunny
Wile E. Coyote and the Road Runner
Animated television series about mammals
Animated television series about siblings
Animated television series about families
Television series by Warner Bros. Animation
Television series by Warner Bros. Television Studios
Television series created by Tom Ruegger
Television shows adapted into video games
Television shows set in Tasmania